This was the first edition of the tournament.

Elina Avanesyan and Oksana Selekhmeteva won the title, defeating Arianne Hartono and Olivia Tjandramulia in the final, 7–5, 6–2.

Seeds

Draw

Draw

References
Main Draw

ITF World Tennis Tour Gran Canaria - Doubles